The Rātana Church is a Christian denomination of New Zealand Māori people based on the teachings and principles of the faith healer and prophet Tahupōtiki Wiremu Rātana. On 8 November 1918, Rātana received a divine revelation from the Holy Spirit which commanded him to unite the Māori people in worship of the One True God, Jehovah. On 5 July 1925, the Rātana Established Church of New Zealand was formally established and registered with the Registrar-General of New Zealand.

Beliefs and teachings 
The Ratana church believes in the Holy Trinity, the administration of the True and Faithful Angels, the commissioning and relevance of Tahupotiki Wiremu Ratana as "God's Mouthpiece" in this dispensation, the authority of the scriptures, the rejection of spiritism (tohungaism), the vitalisation and healthiness of the body and soul, faith healing and unity within the church.

Creed of faith 

Glory and Praise be to Jehovah of Hosts, Father, Son and Holy Spirit, and honour also be to the Faithful Angels. 
  
 I believe in Jehovah of Hosts, Father, Son, and Holy Spirit, the Creator of all things that do exist, and the Author of all life, who in Infinite Wisdom and Love presides over all His Creations.
 I believe that man was created in the image of Jehovah, but that through wrongdoing, he lost the possibilities and joy of this his heritage; thus the necessity arose for a Saviour/Redeemer to deliver him from the power and consequences of sin in this life and the life that is beyond the death of the body.
 I believe that Jehovah sent His Son in the human form (of Jesus Christ) to redeem man and to conquer the power of sin, of darkness and of death. Heaven is now Christ's throne and the earth is his foot-stool, but His chosen dwelling place is in the hearts of those who truly believe in Him and have union with Him in His Victory and Glory.
 I believe in the Holy Spirit, the Breath of Jehovah, the giver of life, who proceeding from the Father and from the Son is to be worshipped with the Father and the Son. The Prophets spoke by the inspiration of the Holy Spirit. He reveals to man's consciousness his sins and their correction and leads man to trust, and rest firmly upon the Saviour, transforming his heart and mind until he becomes Christ like in Holy Love.
 I believe that the Faithful Angels of Jehovah are ever active doing His will. They are His workers and messengers. They are the helpers of all those who truly believe the Gospel of Jehovah. They are Co-Workers with man. They render continuous loving to Jehovah.
  I believe in the Holy Christian Church, the company of all those who have truly received the Christ and are united with Him and with each other; in seeking righteousness and in rendering loving service to God and to man, and fighting against all evil beliefs and sinful practices.
 I believe as Jesus Christ has taught us, that JEHOVAH is our Heavenly Father and all men are brethren; that all our labours should be, not for personal gain, but in co-operation with each other as co-workers with JEHOVAH for benefit of mankind and the honour of God; that all men should be honest workers, and in love and justice and knowledge, each bear his share of the burden of life, thus serving JEHOVAH and his fellowmen.
 I believe in the Holy Bible, in both the Old Testament and the New Testament, for it is the record of JEHOVAH's greatest revelations concerning the eternal life of the Spirit and the vitality of the body.
 I believe that in JEHOVAH is the light and the great joy for my Spirit and for my body. This fact is experienced through union with Christ in the Infinite Love of the Father and the power of the Holy Spirit and the Faithful Angels, and active fellowship with the true Christian believers.
 I believe that Tahupotiki Wiremu Ratana is a MOUTHPIECE of JEHOVAH, spreading abroad new light as the above truths concerning the salvation of the Spirit and the vitalising of the body.

Amen

Headquarters at Rātana Pā 
The headquarters of the Rātana Church and movement is at Rātana Pā, located 20 km south of Whanganui. Formerly the farm of Tahupotiki Wiremu Ratana, Rātana Pā became a settlement of Rātana followers in the 1920s. Located there is the Temepara Tapu o Ihoa (Holy Temple of Jehovah), the Manuao (an accommodation facility and head office of the church), the Whare Māori (which contains crutches and wheelchairs from followers who were healed by Rātana in the 1920s and 1930s) and the Ratana Archives Center, which contains artifacts and stories from the history of the Rātana Church.

25 January and 8 November are anniversary days of the Rātana Church. On these days thousands of church members converge on Rātana Pā for the special anniversary services commemorating the birth of Rātana (25 January 1873) (25 January 1873) and his first spiritual vision (8 November 1918).

Servants of the church
Servants of the Church are also called Officers. They are the Morehu (members) who hold offices in the church and movement which include the spiritual and physical aspects of the Faith. The Servants of the Church are called in Maori, Te Pou o Te Haahi. The following is the hierarchical system from Top to Bottom of all offices of the church and movement.

PRESIDENT:
The President is the head of the church on earth and is known as the Tumuaki. He/She is both Servant of Man and Servant of God. The spiritual title attributed to the Tumuaki is the Defender of the Faith. The Tumuaki can be selected from within the Membership of the Ratana Church.

SYNOD:
The Synod is the policy-making body of the Church and Movement and is known as Hui Whakapumau. Synod shall convene during the annual 25 January Celebrations each year. The Synod is responsible for deciding on various issues concerning the church in local and regional areas.

COUNCIL OF TWELVE APOSTLES:
The Council of Twelves Apostles is the highest council authority in the church and is also known as Te Runanga. Members are chosen from the Ratana community itself.

CHURCH EXECUTIVE:
The Executive Committee of Ratana Pa. shall be recognised as the Head, or CHURCH COMMITTEE of the Church, or Spiritual Works, and shall be called the "RATANA CHURCH EXECUTIVE COMMITTEE".

TE WHETU MARAMA O TE KOTAHITANGA:
Te Whetu Marama is the chief newspaper and publishing arm of the Church and Movement.

DISTRICT APOSTLE:
The District Apostle (Apotoro Takiwa) is a Registered Apostle (see below) in charge of presiding over various parishes in His district.

REGISTERED APOSTLE:
The Registered Apostle (Apotoro Rehita) is a registered minister with the power to marry people and preside over a parish. The Registered Apostle wears a purple bib, a purple cassock, a white surplice, a purple stole with pink tassels, and a degree hood. All Apostles meet in July at Ratana Pa for the Apostles Annual Convention.

SPIRITUAL APOSTLE:
The Spiritual Apostle (Apotoro Wairua) is a lay-councillor in the church. He assists the Registered Apostle in Parish Life. The Spiritual Apostle wears a blue bib, a blue gown and red stole.

DISCIPLE:
The Disciple (Akonga) is a male member of the church training to become an Apostle later. The Disciple wears a white gown, yellow stole and blue bib.

SISTER OF MERCY:
A Sister of Mercy (Awhina) is a lay-woman of the church who assists the Apostle in Parish Life. She is also known as a Deaconess. A Sister of Mercy wears a purple cassock and white habit.

PSALMIST:
A Psalmist (Roopu Raupo Waiata) is a lay-woman of the church who leads the Devotional Prayers in the Worship Service. The Psalmists wear an orange cassock and orange habit.

PARISH CHURCH COMMITTEE:
The Parish Church Committee (Komiti Haahi) is responsible for the needs of the local parish.

BANDS:
The Bands (Nga Reo) are important to the church. There are seven bands:
 Te Reo o Te Arepa (Ratana Pa)
 Te Reo o Te Omeka Ratana Manuao (Mangakahia / Auckland)
 Te Reo o Piri-Wiri-Tua (Kaikohe)
 Te Reo o Hamuera (Napier, Taupo, Turangi)
 Te Reo Te Ratana Tua-Toru (Tauranga)
 Te Reo o Nga Tuahine (Wellington)
 Te Reo Te Whaea o Te Katoa (Christchurch)

The Bands are responsible for leading the Morehu to the Worship Service and Temple at Ratana Pa. These Band were formed and named after prominent people within the church who significantly helped to shape the church. The bands also have significant spiritual roles and purposes, and service the followers (Morehu) that belong in these certain areas around New Zealand.

CHOIRS:
The Choirs (Nga Koea) are important in the church. The Choirs are responsible for leading the Morehu in Congregational Singing in the Worship Service.

CHURCH WARDENS:
The Church Wardens (Kaitiaki-Whakamoemiti) are responsible for keeping peace and order in the Worship Service and recording attendance during the Worship Service (Whakamoemiti).

Important dates
 8 November – 2pm – The Birth of our Maramatanga. Date Ratana had visitation from the Holy Spirit in 1918.
 11 November – 11am – Passing of Ratanas' son Te Omeka in Wanganui at the 11th hour, the 11th day of the 11th month in 1932.
 25 December – 11am – Birth of Jesus Christ.
 1 January – Midnight – New Year. Passing of Ratanas' son Te Arepa on 31 December 1931.
 25 January – 11am – Ratana was born on this day 12 noon in 1873.
 6 February – Signing of The Treaty of Waitangi and the Opening of Kii Koopu in 1938.
 Good Friday to Easter Monday – Death and Resurrection of Jesus. Hui Whakapumau.
 5 July 1935 – Consecration of Temple Archway.
 15 July 1925 – The Ratana Established Church of New Zealand registered.
 18 September 1939 – 10am – Ratana died at age 66.
 22 October 1934 – Passing of Ratanas' son Hamuera.
 25 January 1928 – Physical opening of the Temepara by Juji Nakata & Ratana (Mangai).
 11 September 1938 – Opening of original Manuao.
 26 April 1940 – Te Urumanao Ngāpaki Baker (Te Whaea o te Katoa) died.

Worship service
All Ratana Church parishes hold the worship service known as Whakamoemiti at 11:00am each Sunday. The service is led by the Apotoro. Attendees are asked to dress formally and take no money into the Worship area. All monies must be left outside the Worship area or placed in the offering pouch. The whole service is conducted in the Maori language with parts in the English language if desired. The Hymns and Prayers are said out of the Ratana Book of Hymns and Prayers (a.k.a. Blue Book). Devotional Prayers are led by the Roopu Raupo. Congregational Singing is led by the Choir. Most parishes operate autonomously however still remaining united with the Church Administration (KOMITI HAAHI MATUA).

The following is the order of service for the Whakamoemiti:

1. Apostle – (Must confess his own sins or 
wrongdoings first).

2. Apostle – (Opening Prayer) – 
O Spirit of God, True and Faithful 
Angels and Holy Trinity. Join us in this, 
our hour of praise and thanksgiving to make final 
decisions on every word that we speak in 
your glorious Kingdom. For you are the 
beginning and the end of our hopes and 
desires in your glorious Kingdom. May 
the Spirit of God confirm this 
Prayer now and forever Amen.

3. Apostle – (Take Confession and Repentance) O brethren, do we agree to confess our sins and wrongdoings before The Father, Son, Holy Spirit, so that they may burn our sins in the Holy Fire until they turn to ashes, Agreed?

– Answer – "Yes we agree"
(Repentance) – And with heart and in mind, do we agree to continually abide in humble repentance, so that we may be born again in the Spirit. Agreed?

– Answer – "Yes we agree"

4. Apostle – (Thanksgiving Prayer) O Spirit of God, True and Faithful Angels and Holy Trinity, you have now heard our confessions and repentance, therefore it is fitting that we give praise and thanksgiving before you for the blessings we have received in days gone by, right up to this present day. We ask that you instil your unconditional love upon us for all times. May God's Spirit confirm this prayer now and forever – Amen .

5. Song of Praise and Thanksgiving.

6. The Psalm Singers – (Devotional Prayer) – (After the Devotional Prayer is this short prayer by the Apostle) – Be seated o brethren in the name of The Father, Son, Holy Spirit, True and Faithful Angels and the Spirit of God – Amen.

7. The Sermon – (After the sermon is this prayer) O True and Faithful Angels, instil the words of truth and righteousness within this sermon, into the hearts of the brethren an essence of goodness for the physical and spiritual body for all times. May the Spirit of God confirm this prayer now and forever Amen.

8. Doxology – Song. 70. MA TE MARIE (MAY THE PEACE)

9. Prayer from the heart.

10.(Closing Prayer)- 
O Spirit of God, True and Faithful Angels, and 
Holy Trinity, embrace us in true 
brotherly love, bind us together in unity and peace.
May God's Spirit confirm this prayer now and 
forever – Amen.

Ratana Church of Australia 

Monday 15 August 1983, fifth president of the Ratana Established Church of New Zealand, Maata "Te Reo" Hura, sanctioned the Ratana Church of Australia. It is estimated that there are more than 20,000 Ratana Church members in Australia (2008).

On 31 August 2003 the seventh tumuaki Harerangi Meihana conducted a pastoral visit to the Morehu of Sydney, District of Australia. In September 2005, Te Reo O Piri-Wiri-Tua, (one of seven Ratana Brass/Silver Bands) travelled to Sydney. 
A scout hall is named after them at Glenfield Scout Activity Center, Cambridge Avenue, Glenfield, New South Wales.
Recently, Te Reo O te Arepa, (one of the seven Ratana Brass/Silver Bands) have established a branch in Sydney. The District of Australia is currently being administered by District Apostle (Apotoro Takiwa) Te Kotahitanga Abraham.

List of parishes 
 Kai Hapai i te Rama (Manurewa)
 Kia Mataara (Otara)
 Kia Maia (Mangere East)
 Pukekiwiriki (Papakura)
 Rotorua (Waiariki)
 Te Whitinga I Nga Moana 1924–1925 (Pukekohe)
 Takanini (Takanini)
 Te Papaioea (Palmerston North)
 Taupo ki Waimarino (Taupo)
 Manawanui (Manurewa)
 Oruawharo
 Otamatea
 Puke Ariki (Taranaki)
 Turanganui (Gisborne)
 Mangamuka me Mangataipa Pariha o te Haahi Ratana Aotearoa New Zealand (Mangamuka)
 Nga Tapuwae o te Mangai (Te Kao)
 Ponsonby
 Te Reo Powhiri (Te Hapua)
 Te Taku Tai Moana te Rohe (Ahipara)
 Te Tatau (Sydney)
 Te Piringa (Sydney)
 Te Arepa Pariha Perth WA Inc. (Western Australia)
 Te Pariha o Te Puawaitanga o Ihoa – Te Kuiti (Waikato Te Rohe Potae) 
 Huntly Morehu Parish (Waikato Te Rohe Potae) 
 Kemureti Pariha Cambridge (Waikato Te Rohe Potae)
 Kirikiriroa Pariha Hamilton (Waikato Te Rohe Potae)
 Hamilton Morehu Congregation (Waikato Te Rohe Potae)  
 Mangatoatoa Kihikihi (Waikato Te Rohe Potae) 
 Marton Morehu Komiti Haahi (Marton)
 Glen Innes Tamaki  Pariha (Glen Innes, Auckland)
 Te Kii O Te Wairua Tapu Pariha (Melbourne)
 Taumarunui Ratana Church Parish 
Piripono  (Faithful) Logan City Pariha (Brisbane)
 PiriWiriTua Pa – Te Haroto Marae
 Hamuera Pa – Moteo Marae
 Orakei Tamaki Makaurau Pariha
 Te Reo o te Morehu. (Whangarei)
 Nga Pariha o Mangakahia (Mangakahia)

Christian denominations in New Zealand
Māori organisations
Māori religion
Christian denominations in Australia
Indigenous Christianity
Rātanas